The women's sprint competition of the Biathlon European Championships 2011 was held on February 22, 2011 at 10:00 local time.

External links
 Results

Biathlon European Championships 2011
2011 in Italian women's sport